Algernon Sydney Griffiths (23 May 1847 – 18 April 1899) was an English first-class cricketer active 1867–73 who played for Middlesex. He was born in Marylebone and died in West Kensington. He was the son of George Richard Griffiths and Letitia Chatfield. According to an entry in Burke's Landed Gentry, he was a brevet colonel and lieutenant-colonel in the Royal Artillery. In the Army List of 1888, he was described as a major. His brother, Herbert, was also a first-class cricketer.

References

1847 births
1899 deaths
English cricketers
Middlesex cricketers
Marylebone Cricket Club cricketers
Gentlemen of the South cricketers
Gentlemen of Marylebone Cricket Club cricketers
Royal Artillery officers